Robert Wald (born September 5, 1948) is an American sound engineer. He was nominated for an Academy Award in the category Best Sound for the film RoboCop. He has had nearly 50 film and television credits since his start in 1976.

Selected filmography
 RoboCop (1987)

References

External links

1948 births
Living people
American audio engineers
People from Los Angeles
Engineers from California